Deletion or delete may refer to:

Computing
 File deletion, a way of removing a file from a computer's file system
 Code cleanup, a way of removing unnecessary variables, data structures, cookies, and temporary files in a programming language
 Delete key, a key on modern computer keyboards that erases text
 Delete character, DEL, the delete control code in ASCII and C0 and C1 control codes
 delete (C++) operator, a built-in operator in the C++ programming language

Arts and entertainment
 Deletion (music industry), a term for removing a record from a label's catalog
 Delete (miniseries), a 2011 TV miniseries
 Delete (Dara Bubamara song)
 Delete (DMA's song)
 Delete (Story Untold song)
 "Delete!", a catchphrase used by professional wrestler Matt Hardy under his Broken gimmick.

Wikipedia
 Deletion of articles on Wikipedia, an activity on Wikipedia 

 Speedy deletion, a deletion process on Wikipedia 

 Proposed deletion, a deletion process on Wikipedia 

 Articles for deletion, a deletion process on Wikipedia 

 Deletion review, a deletion-related process on Wikipedia

Other uses
 Deletion (genetics), deletion of a gene or chromosome segment, symbolized in the literature by a Δ symbol
 Elision, the deletion of a sound or sounds
 Ellipsis (linguistics), grammatical deletion of a word